Abigail Hyndman (born 1990) is a Virgin Islander beauty pageant titleholder. Crowned Miss British Virgin Islands 2011, she also represented the British overseas territory in the 2012 Miss Universe pageant.

Early life
Born in 1990, she was a student of biology at Xavier University in Louisiana in 2012, where she considered becoming a nun as well.

Pageant career 
She was among 89 contestants vying for Miss Universe 2012.

Abigail Hyndman was chosen as Miss British Virgin Islands 2011 during the final event held at the Multi Purpose Sports Complex on 31 July 2011 in Road Town.

Hyndman represented the British Virgin Islands in Miss Universe 2012.

References

External links
Official Miss British Virgin Islands website

1990 births
British Virgin Islands beauty pageant winners
Living people
Miss Universe 2012 contestants
British expatriates in the United States
Xavier University alumni